The Aschehoug Prize is published annually by the Norwegian publishing house Aschehoug. The Aschehoug Prize is awarded to Norwegian authors on the basis of the merit of a recent publication. It is awarded on merit, irrespective of the publisher, based on a binding recommendation from the Norwegian Critics Organization. The prize consists of a statuette  of sculptor  Ørnulf Bast and 100,000 kroner (2018). The monumental sculpture Evig Liv (=Eternal Life) which is the reference of the miniature statuette is to be found at Sehesteds plass in front of the publisher's main building in Oslo.

Recipients of the Aschehoug Prize
 1973 – Stein Mehren 
 1974 – Bjørg Vik 
 1975 – Kjartan Fløgstad 
 1976 – Karin Bang 
 1977 – Knut Hauge 
 1978 – Olav H. Hauge 
 1979 – Ernst Orvil and Tor Åge Bringsværd 
 1980 – Idar Kristiansen 
 1981 – Jan Erik Vold 
 1982 – Kjell Erik Vindtorn 
 1983 – Arnold Eidslott 
 1984 – Cecilie Løveid 
 1985 – Edvard Hoem 
 1986 – Rolf Jacobsen 
 1987 – Finn Carling 
 1988 – Einar Økland 
 1989 – Bergljot Hobæk Haff 
 1990 – Erling Kittelsen 
 1991 – Kjell Askildsen 
 1992 – Eldrid Lunden 
 1993 – Jan Kjærstad 
 1994 – Inger Elisabeth Hansen 
 1995 – Lars Amund Vaage 
 1996 – Tor Fretheim 
 1997 – Jon Fosse 
 1998 – Gro Dahle 
 1999 – Øyvind Berg 
 2000 – Laila Stien 
 2001 – Ole Robert Sunde 
 2002 – Ellen Einan 
 2003 – Steinar Opstad 
 2004 – Dag Solstad 
 2005 – Hans Herbjørnsrud 
 2006 – Espen Haavardsholm 
 2007 – Hanne Ørstavik 
 2008 – Paal-Helge Haugen 
 2009 – Thure Erik Lund 
 2010 – Anne Oterholm 
 2011 – Bjørn Sortland
 2012 – Ragnar Hovland
 2013 – Erlend Loe
 2014 – Geir Gulliksen
 2015 – Vigdis Hjorth
 2016 – Per Petterson
 2017 – Øyvind Rimbereid
 2018 – Liv Køltzow
 2019 – Johan Harstad
 2020 – no award
 2021 - Karin Haugane
 2022 - Linn Ullmann

References

Norwegian literary awards
Awards established in 1973